Garth Smith (born May 18, 1969) is a Canadian curler.

Teams

Personal life
Smith attended John Taylor Collegiate and the University of Manitoba. He is the President of Momentum Dietary Solutions. He was born in and resides in Winnipeg, but lived in Calgary from roughly 1997 to 2007. 

In addition to curling, Smith was the member of the Manitoba Junior Men's Baseball Championship team.

References

External links
 
 Garth Smith – Curling Canada Stats Archive
 

Living people
1969 births
Curlers from Winnipeg
Canadian male curlers
World curling champions
Brier champions
University of Manitoba alumni
Curlers from Calgary
Canadian baseball players
Canada Cup (curling) participants